This is a list of seasons completed by the San Antonio Talons. The Talons are a professional arena football franchise of the Arena Football League (AFL), based in San Antonio, Texas. Formerly the Tulsa Talons, the team was established in 2000 as a charter member of arenafootball2 (AF2), and currently play their home games at BOK Center. Until 2011, the Talons qualified for the playoffs in every year of their existence, including nine consecutive division titles. While in AF2, the Talons won the AF2's championship game, the ArenaCup, twice. Their first league title came in 2003, winning ArenaCup IV, and their most recent was ArenaCup VIII in 2007.

After the 2009 AF2 season, the league effectively dissolved. The AFL had suspended operations for 2009 and also filed for bankruptcy. The AFL relaunched in 2010, with the Talons participating in its first season back.

Following the  season, it was announced the Talons were moving to San Antonio, Texas.

References
General
 

Specific

Arena Football League seasons by team
Seasons
Oklahoma sports-related lists
San Antonio Talons seasons
San Antonio Talons seasons